Accokeek was the name of a tribe of Native Americans in the United States.  The tribe is now extinct.

Accokeek may also refer to:

Accokeek Creek Site, an archeological site in Maryland
Accokeek, Maryland, a census-designated place in Prince George's County
Accokeek (plantation), the 17th-century plantation of George Mason I
Accokeek Road (Maryland Route 373) in Prince George's County
USS Accokeek (ATA-181), a U.S. Navy ship
Accokeek Creek,  tributary of Potomac Creek, itself a tributary of the Potomac River, in Stafford County, Virginia, United States
Accokeek Furnace Archeological Site, historic archaeological site located near Stafford, Stafford County, Virginia